Brodrick is a given name and surname. Notable people with the name include:

Given name
Brodrick Bunkley (born 1983), American football player
Brodrick Haldane (1912–1996), Scottish-born photographer
Brodrick Hartwell (1909–1993), British baronet
Brodrick C. D. A. Hartwell (1876–1948), British Army officer

Surname
 Alan Brodrick, 1st Viscount Midleton
 Alan Brodrick, 2nd Viscount Midleton
Callum Brodrick (born 1998), English cricketer
 Charles Brodrick, Archbishop of Cashel
 Cuthbert Brodrick, British architect
 George Brodrick, 2nd Earl of Midleton
 George Brodrick, 3rd Viscount Midleton
 George Charles Brodrick, British historian
 St John Brodrick, 1st Earl of Midleton
 William Brodrick (writer)
 William Brodrick, 8th Viscount Midleton

See also
 Broadrick, surname
 Broderick, given name and surname
 Brodric, given name